Pectinophora fusculella is a moth of the family Gelechiidae. It was described by Arnold Pagenstecher in 1900. It is found on the Bismarck Archipelago.

The wingspan is 25–28 mm. The forewings are shining chestnut-brown with ill-defined groups of scales, forming medial and postmedial bands. The hindwings are lighter brown.

References

Moths described in 1900
Pexicopiini